Lars "Lasse" Kolstad (10 January 1922 – 14 January 2012) was a Norwegian actor and singer. Active from the 1940s, he was known from many stage roles, but primarily as "Tevye" in Fiddler on the Roof.

As a secondary school student, Kolstad was president of the graduating class (russ) council of his school, and eventually for all of Oslo. As this was in 1940, the German occupation of Norway put a damper on any great festivities that year. In 1943 he had his début at Trøndelag Teater, where he remained until 1949. He has later worked at Centralteatret, Edderkoppen, Riksteatret, Fjernsynsteatret og Det Norske Teatret. He has had roles in plays by Ibsen, Shakespeare and Sophocles, and musicals such as Zorba and The Threepenny Opera. His best-known character though, was "Tevye" in Fiddler on the Roof, a role Kolstad played 400 times.

Kolstad also had various roles in movies and on television, and still took on occasional roles after his retirement. In 1958 he took part in the documentary Windjammer about the full-rigged ship Christian Radich. He played the title role in the television series Skipper Worse (1968), based on the novel by Alexander Kielland, and was a Viking in the American movie The Island at the Top of the World (1974).

Kolstad was married to the actress Bab Christensen; they lived in Oslo and had one child. His older brother Henki, who died in 2008, was also a well-known actor.

Select filmography

References

External links

1922 births
2012 deaths
Norwegian male singers
Norwegian male film actors
Norwegian male television actors
Norwegian male stage actors
Male actors from Oslo